Dimestrol (brand names Depot-Cyren, Depot-Oestromon), also known as dianisylhexene, 4,4'-dimethoxy-α,α'-diethylstilbene, diethylstilbestrol dimethyl ether, and dimethoxydiethylstilbestrol, is a synthetic nonsteroidal estrogen of the stilbestrol group which is related to diethylstilbestrol. It has been used clinically as a hormonal therapy in cases of delayed female puberty, hypogonadism, menopausal, and postmenopausal symptoms. It is known to induce the development of female secondary sexual characteristics in the case of female delayed puberty or hypogonadism. The drug has also been used as a growth promoter in livestock.

DES is a known endocrine disrupting chemical. Molecularly, it is known to increase the risk of aneuploidy via interference with microtubule assembly.

Prior to the 1950s, DES was widely prescribed to pregnant women to prevent miscarriage and preterm labor. A study released in the 1950s found that women who were exposed to DES were at increased risk for cervical and vaginal clear cell adenocarcinoma. Shortly after this finding, the FDA discouraged the prescription of DES to pregnant women. Children were also affected by the maternal use of DES during their gestation. Study findings showed that daughters were more likely to develop fertility complications such as premature delivery, neonatal death, miscarriage, ectopic pregnancy, stillbirth, infertility, and preeclampsia. DES exposed sons may also experience genital abnormalities but no conclusive increased risk of infertility. 

In the case of suspected or known exposure to DES before, women are encouraged to receive pelvic examinations, PAP tests, biopsies, and breast examinations. Men should receive routine examinations from their physician in the case of suspected or potential exposure. 

The medication has a long duration of action of 6 weeks given by intramuscular injection.

See also 
 List of estrogen esters § Ethers of nonsteroidal estrogens

References 

Abandoned drugs
Estrogen ethers
Phenols
Stilbenoids
Synthetic estrogens